The discography of alan, a Chinese singer of Tibetan ethnicity active in Japan and China, consists of seven studio albums, one compilation album, two extended play, seventeen singles, fifty eight digital releases and three concert DVDs.

Studio albums

Japanese

Chinese

Compilation albums

EPs

Singles

Digital releases

Japanese

Chinese

DVDs

References

Discographies of Chinese artists